The Swan 47 is a Sailing boat designed by Olin Stephens and built by Nautor's Swan and first launched in 1972.

External links
 Nautor Swan
 Swan 47

References

Sailing yachts
Keelboats
1970s sailboat type designs
Sailboat types built by Nautor Swan
Sailboat type designs by Sparkman and Stephens
Sailboat type designs by Olin Stephens